The Comando de Operações Táticas (Portuguese for Command Of Tactical Operations), mostly known by its acronym COT, is the tactical unit of the Federal Police of Brazil. It was created after Brazilian parliament recommendations, in an attempt to have a specialized counter-terrorism force. It was placed in service in 1987.

Selection and process
The group is made up of Federal Agents of the Brazilian Federal Police Department. These agents take the Tactical Training Course for 14 weeks.
Federal police officers volunteer to join COT - there is no obligation or any recruitment. The selection is rigorous and requires high physical and mental fitness, assessed by a series of preliminary tests, in which about 60% of the candidates are eliminated. After this first phase, candidates undergo a training of more than one year until the final exam, after which they are finally admitted as members of the COT, immediately starting the training together with the rest of the team and being subject to a probationary stage, Where they will be evaluated their coexistence with the group, promptness in tactical-police actions and performance in the training given.

Activities

The COT is the elite unit of the Federal Police and is responsible for high-risk and complex interventions that require preparation beyond the conventional police forces. All COT officers are only employed in situations of high or high risk, differentiated from non-specialized federal police officers.

Over the years, the COT adapted and evolved its training program based on the Brazilian reality; In addition to training common to the special operations units of other police in the world, COT has specific training to deal with operations against drug trafficking, terrorism and in biomes typical of Brazil, such as tropical forest, caatinga (desertic), marshland and cerrado. The COT is also responsible for resolving cases of seizure of civil aircraft within Brazil, with or without hostages.

The TOC performs, on average, 110 operations per year throughout Brazil, distributed among sub-teams. In the interval of time they are not performing an operation, the members of the TOC are in uninterrupted training at the Brasília base, being available and being able to be activated for an operation at any time.

Since its inception, COT has never had a police officer killed in combat or any case of corruption among members of its staff.

References

External links
 Departamento de Policia Federal

Non-military counterterrorist organizations
Specialist police agencies of Brazil